Paraplatyptilia atlantica is a moth of the family Pterophoridae. It is known from Newfoundland, Labrador, and Quebec.

The host plant is unknown.

Etymology
The name refers to the area of occurrence, Newfoundland and Labrador being one of the Canadian provinces collectively known as Atlantic Canada.

References

Moths of North America
atlantica
Moths described in 2008